Sagitta was a female athletic club in the Netherlands organised by Jan Blankers in 1936.   Integrated with Blauw-Wit into Phanos on 1 January 2000.

Between 1950 and 1954 the 4 × 100 m relay won five national titles.  Sagitta athletes participated in Dutch 4 × 100 m relay in several olympic games.

Athletes
 Corrie Bakker
 Fanny Blankers-Koen
 Loes Boling
 Annemieke Bouma
 Stans Brehm
 Nel Büch
 Ciska Jansen
 Gré de Jongh
 Ans Niesink
 Nel Roos-Lodder
 Hilda Slaman
 Lies Sluijters
 Tilly van der Zwaard
 Els van Noorduyn

References

Sports clubs in Amsterdam
Athletics clubs in the Netherlands